The 2012 United States House of Representatives elections in Utah were held on Tuesday, November 6, 2012 and elected the four U.S. Representatives from the state of Utah, an increase of one seat in reapportionment following the 2010 United States Census. The elections coincided with the elections of other federal and state offices, including a quadrennial presidential election and an election to the U.S. Senate. Primary elections were held on June 26, 2012.

Overview

Redistricting 
In Utah, the redistricting process was controlled by members of the Republican Party, who formed a majority on the State Legislature's redistricting committee. The plan passed October 2011 divides Salt Lake County among three districts, which Republicans argued would require Utah's U.S. Representatives focus on both urban and rural issues. Jim Dabakis, the chair of the Utah Democratic Party, argued that the map constituted a gerrymander designed to benefit the Republican Party.

District 1 
Republican incumbent Rob Bishop, who has represented Utah's 1st congressional district since 2003, ran for re-election, having decided against running for governor.

Republican primary

Candidates

Nominee
Rob Bishop, incumbent U.S. Representative

Eliminated in primary
Leonard "Joe" Fabiano, business entrepreneur and candidate for senate in 2010
Jacqueline Smith, homemaker and Tea Party activist

Withdrawn
Michael Miller, Iraq War veteran

Results
Rob Bishop became the official Republican Candidate April 21, 2012 at the State Republican Convention.

Democratic primary

Candidates

Nominee
Donna McAleer, management consultant and West Point graduate

Eliminated in primary
Ryan Combe, small business owner

Results

Constitution primary

Candidates

Nominee
Sherry Phipps

General election

Polling

Results

External links
 Michael Miller campaign website
 Jacqueline Smith campaign website

District 2 
Democratic incumbent Jim Matheson, who has represented Utah's 2nd congressional district since 2001, sought re-election in the new 4th district.

Democratic primary

Candidates

Nominee
Jay Seegmiller, former state representative

Eliminated in primary
Dean Collinwood
Mike Small

Republican primary

Candidates

Nominee
Chris Stewart, author, former U.S. Air Force pilot, and president of an energy consulting firm;

Eliminated in primary
Jason Buck, former American football player at Brigham Young University and in the National Football League
Dave Clark, former speaker of the Utah House of Representatives;
Cherilyn Eagar, business owner and candidate for Senate in 2010;
Robert Fuehr, former telecommunications executive and Harvard University MBA alumnus 
Milton Hanks
Edward Mayerhofer
Jeramey McElhaney, small business owner
Howard Wallack
Chuck Williams, former Assistant Deputy Under Secretary of Defense for Installations and Environment and retired U.S. Air Force lieutenant colonel;
John Willoughby, airline pilot,

Withdrawn
Morgan Philpot, former state representative and nominee for this seat in 2010

Declined
Dan Liljenquist, state senator

Results

Constitution primary

Candidates

Nominee
Jonathan D. Garrard

Independents
Independent candidate Charles Kimball also filed.

General election

Endorsements

Polling

Predictions

Results

External links
 Jay Seegmiller campaign website
 Dean Collinwood campaign website
 Jason Buck campaign website
 Cherilyn Eagar campaign website
 Chris Stewart campaign website
 Howard Wallack campaign website
 Chuck Williams campaign website
 Charles Kimball campaign website
 Bob Fuehr campaign website

District 3 
Jason Chaffetz, was seeking a third term in representing Utah's 3rd congressional district;

Republican primary

Candidates

Nominee
Jason Chaffetz, incumbent U.S. Representative

Eliminated in primary
Brian Jenkins
Lynn D. Wardle

Withdrawn
Kurt Bradburn.
Leonard "Joe" Fabiano, business entrepreneur and candidate for senate in 2010

Results

Democratic primary

Candidates

Nominee
Soren Simonsen, Salt Lake City Council Chair

Eliminated in primary
Richard Clark

General election

Endorsements

Polling

Results

External links
 Jason Chaffetz campaign website
 Soren Simonsen campaign website

District 4
Democratic U.S. Representative Jim Matheson, who has represented Utah's 2nd congressional district since 2001 and had considered running for governor or for the U.S. Senate, sought re-election to the House in Utah's new 4th congressional district after his previous seat was split up by the redistricting.

Democratic primary

Candidates

Nominee
Jim Matheson, incumbent U.S. Representative for the 2nd district

Republican primary

Candidates

Nominee
Mia Love, Mayor of Saratoga Springs

Eliminated in primary
Jay Cobb, attorney
Kenneth Gray
Stephen Sandstrom, state representative
Carl Wimmer, state representative

Declined
Jason Buck, former American football player at Brigham Young University and National Football League

Polling

Results
In the Republican convention, held on April 21, 2012, Love received 70.4% of the vote (she needed more than 60% to avoid a primary).

Libertarian primary

Candidates

Nominee
Jim Vein

Withdrawn
Ken Larsen, medical researcher

Justice primary

Candidates

Withdrawn
Torin Nelson

General election

Campaign
Despite beginning her campaign at a significant name recognition disadvantage to Matheson, Love was able to mount a strong challenge. This was in part fueled by a prime time speaking slot at the Republican National Convention where she impressed many with her backstory of a being the daughter of Haitian immigrants whose parents "Immigrated to the U.S. with $10 in their pocket" and her themes of self-reliance, small government and fiscal responsibility. However she was later hit by claims that she was technically an Anchor Baby, despite having seemingly backing the deportation of the US-born children of illegal immigrants.

Facing a district largely new to him, Matheson ran ads showcasing his independent credentials and airing clips of Love voicing support for cutting the Department of Education and privatizing Social Security. Despite the NRCC running ads trying to tie him to Nancy Pelosi and Barack Obama, Matheson's favorability rating remained at around 60% throughout the campaign.

Endorsements

Polling

An early poll published by the Deseret News on Dec 25, 2011 showed Jim Matheson leading all potential opponents.

With Cobb

With Sandstrom

With Wimmer

Predictions

Results
Matheson narrowly defeated the Love in the general election by only 768 votes. If Love had won the seat, she would have become the first African-American Republican woman to sit in the House.

External links
 Jay Cobb campaign website
 Mia Love campaign website
 Jim Matheson campaign website
 Stephen Sandstrom campaign website
 Carl Wimmer campaign website

References

External links
Elections Division at the Utah Secretary of State
United States House of Representatives elections in Utah, 2012 at Ballotpedia
Utah U.S. House from OurCampaigns.com
Campaign contributions at OpenSecrets.org
Outside spending at the Sunlight Foundation

Utah

2012
2012 Utah elections